Zhao Haiyan (born February 1963) is a former Chinese politician who spent most of her career in her home-province Henan. She was investigated by the Chinese Communist Party's anti-graft agency in July 2016. Previously she served as Communist Party Secretary of Sanmenxia.

Biography
Zhao was born in February 1963 in Huixian, Henan. She entered the China University of Political Science and Law in September 1980, majoring in law, where she graduated in July 1984. After graduation, she entered politics as a civil servant in Henan Provincial Women's Federation. Zhao also studied at Tsinghua University from September 2005 to July 2007 as a part-time student.

In October 1998 she was promoted to become deputy party chief of Mianchi County, and concurrently served as magistrate in May 2000.

She was party chief of Yima in March 2001, and held that office until August 2002.

In August 2002, she was appointed the vice-mayor of Xinxiang, she remained in that position until October 2008, when she was transferred to Jiaozuo and appointed vice-mayor there.

She became deputy party chief of Sanmenxia in May 2011, and concurrently served as mayor of the city in July 2011, in August 2015 she was promoted again to become party chief, the top political position in the city, and served until August 2016. During her tenure, although she has held the position for only one year, she adjusted over one hundred positions of her subordinates. Some of the people who were close to her were promoted. So the folk called her "Secretary of Selling Official Position".

Downfall
On July 16, 2016, Zhao was suspected of "serious violations of discipline", said one-sentence statement issued by the ruling Communist Party's corruption watchdog body, the Central Commission for Discipline Inspection (CCDI). On August 24, she removed from public office. On December 25, she was removed from membership of the National People's Congress, the national legislature of the People's Republic of China.

On June 6, 2018, Zhao's husband Zhang Jin (born 1956), who formerly served as director of the Bureau of Geology and Mineral Exploration in Henan, was put under investigation for alleged "serious violations of discipline and laws."

On November 30, 2018, she was sentenced 11 years in prison for bribery. She was charged with accepting bribes worth 10.25 million yuan by the Intermediate People's Court of Zhengzhou.

References

1963 births
China University of Political Science and Law alumni
Tsinghua University alumni
Living people
People's Republic of China politicians from Henan
Chinese Communist Party politicians from Henan
People from Huixian